Amsterdam Beach State Park is a  undeveloped state park on the Atlantic Ocean in the Town of East Hampton just east of Montauk, New York. The land is also known as the Amsterdam Beach Preserve.

History
The land was acquired for a total of $16.5 million, of which the Town of East Hampton paid $6 million, Suffolk County paid $5.5 million, New York State paid $4 million, and $1 million was paid from a federal grant.

At the time of its purchase, the property represented one of the largest unprotected continuous tracts of undeveloped land in Montauk.

The property is owned jointly by New York State, the Town of East Hampton and Suffolk County.

Park description
The park, located between Shadmoor State Park and the Nature Conservancy's Andy Warhol Preserve, is largely undeveloped and is maintained with the intention of preserving its value as natural habitat.

Woody vegetation at Amsterdam Beach consists mainly of shadbush (Amelanchier), highbush blueberry (Vaccinium corymbosum), black cherry (Prunus serotina), arrowwood (Viburnum dentatum), and several species of holly (Ilex). The land hosts several regionally threatened species, including northern harriers, spotted turtles and Cooper's hawks, and is additionally utilized by shorebirds and migratory bird species following the Atlantic Flyway. A number of amphibians, including the protected blue-spotted salamander, have been observed at Amsterdam Beach.

A network of trails was completed on the property in 2011.

See also
List of New York state parks

References 

East Hampton (town), New York
State parks of New York (state)
Parks in Suffolk County, New York
Protected areas established in 2005
2005 establishments in New York (state)